The eleventh season of NCIS: Los Angeles an American police procedural drama television series, premiered on CBS on September 29, 2019, and concluded on April 26, 2020. Only 22 episodes were produced due to the COVID-19 pandemic in the United States. The season is produced by CBS Television Studios.

Cast and characters

Main
 Chris O'Donnell as Grisha "G." Callen, NCIS Supervisory Special Agent, Team Leader
 Daniela Ruah as Kensi Blye, NCIS Special Agent
 Eric Christian Olsen as Marty Deeks, LAPD/NCIS Liaison Detective
 Barrett Foa as Eric Beale, NCIS Senior Technical Operator
 Renée Felice Smith as Nell Jones, NCIS Special Agent and Intelligence Analyst
 Medalion Rahimi as Fatima Namazi, NCIS Special Agent, (episode 16 onwards; episodes 1–7, recurring)
 Linda Hunt as Henrietta Lange, NCIS Supervisory Special Agent (SSA) and Operations Manager
 LL Cool J as Sam Hanna, NCIS Senior Field Agent, Second in Command

Recurring
 Catherine Bell as Lt. Col. Sarah MacKenzie, Marine Liaison to the Secretary of State
 Peter Jacobson as John Rogers, Special Prosecutor
 Gerald McRaney as Hollace Kilbride, Retired Navy Admiral
 Pamela Reed as Roberta Deeks, Marty Deeks' Mother
 Erik Palladino as CIA Officer Vostanik Sabatino
 Moon Bloodgood as Katherine Casillas
 Marsha Thomason as Nicole Dechamps, NCIS Special Agent, Former Secret Service Special Agent
 Bar Paly as Anastasia "Anna" Kolcheck, former ATF Agent, Callen's girlfriend
 Vyto Ruginis as Arkady Kolcheck
 Caleb Castille as FBI Special Agent Devin Roundtree

Guest
 David James Elliott as Harmon Rabb, Navy Captain
 Kiari "Offset" Cephus as Kadri Kashan Khan
 Bill Goldberg as Lance Hamilton, DOJ Agent
 Alyssa Diaz as Jasmine Garcia, NCIS Special Agent
 Don Wallace as Navy Seal Senior Chief Frank Wallace
 Natassia Halabi as Mossad Agent Eliana Sapir
 Gil Birmingham as Navy Captain Steven Douglas
 Wesam Keesh as NCIS Special Agent-afloat Eshan Navid
 Vinnie Jones as Ricky Dorsey
 Steve Valentine as Frankie Bolton
 Dina Meyer as Veronica Stephens
 Malese Jow as Jennifer Kim
 Anna Belknap as Fake NCIS Special Agent Robin Ip
 Shane McMahon as Steve Evans, Army CID Special Agent
 Nitya Vidyasagar as Natasha

Episodes

Production

Development
NCIS: Los Angeles was renewed for an eleventh season on April 22, 2019. In March 2020, CBS announced that the season's production had been delayed due to the COVID-19 pandemic.  As a consequence of this, season eleven's episode order was reduced from 24 to 22.

Casting
In February 2020, Medalion Rahimi, who plays NCIS Special Agent Fatima Namazi, was promoted to a series regular in the middle of the season.

Broadcast
Season eleven of NCIS: Los Angeles premiered on September 29, 2019.

In the United Kingdom, Season Eleven of NCIS: Los Angeles premiered on Sunday December 29, 2019, and concluded on Sunday May 31, 2020.

Reception

Ratings

Home media

References

External links
 
 

2019 American television seasons
2020 American television seasons
10
Television productions suspended due to the COVID-19 pandemic